Pokrovka is a rural locality (a village) in Cherkassky Selsoviet, Ufimsky District, Bashkortostan, Russia. The population was 65 as of 2010. There are 5 streets.

Geography 
Pokrovka is located 37 km northeast of Ufa (the district's administrative centre) by road. Chuvarez is the nearest rural locality.

References 

Rural localities in Ufimsky District